Bertram James was a survivor of The Great Escape.

Berrtram James may also refer to:

Bertram James (screenwriter)

See also
Bert James (disambiguation)